Bruun is a surname of North Germanic origin. The meaning is brown (brun in Danish, Swedish and Norwegian). In Denmark, the name is known to have been in use since the 13th century in the form Bruun. Other spelling variants are Bruhn and Brun. Today, c. 0.1% of the population carries Bruun as their surname or middle name. The name is also in use in Norway (c. 0.02% of the population), the Faroe Islands and the other Nordic countries (even less frequent).

In the Danish translation of Peanuts, Charlie Brown is called Søren Brun.

Abundance
As of 2007, the numbers of bearers of the surnames Bruun, Bruhn and Brun in the Nordic countries are:

The infrequent occurrences of Bruun as a surname outside Scandinavia, mainly Germany, Great Britain, Canada and the U.S., is due to immigration from the Nordic countries; in Germany possibly as a variation over the given name Bruno.

Notable people

Persons with Bruun as their surname
 Anders Bruun (born 1979), a Swedish bandy player
 Angelo Bruun (1898–1956), a Danish actor
 Anton Frederik Bruun (1901–1961), Danish oceanographer and ichthyologist
 Antti Bruun (1979 -), Finnish ice hockey player
 Bertel Bruun (1937–2011), a Danish-American ornithologist and illustrator
 Bertel Kehlet Bruun - (1964 -), a Danish-German landscape architect
 Birgitte Bruun (1953 -), a Danish actress
 Caius Andreas Bruun (1967 -), a Finnish artist photographer
 Christian Bruun (1831–1906), a Danish historian and head of the Danish Royal Library
 Malte Conrad Bruun (1755–1826), a Danish-French geographer and journalist
 Daniel Bruun (1856–1931), a Danish military officer, archaeologist and author
 Edgar Bruun (1905–1985), a Norwegian Olympic race walker
 Else Marie Bruun (1911–2007), a Danish classical violinist
 Erik Bruun (born 1926), a Finnish designer
 Geoffrey Bruun (1899–1988), a Canadian-American historian
 Hans Henrik Bruun (1939-2018), a Danish-British engineer
 Hans Henrik K. Bruun (1965 -), a Danish-Swedish ecologist
 Hans Henrik R. Bruun (1946 -), a Danish sociologist and diplomat
 Helge Gösta Bruun (1897-?), a Swedish botanist
 Henrik H. Bruun, a Finnish entomologist
 Hugo Bruun (1888–1962), a Danish actor
 Kai Aage Bruun (1899–1971), a Danish composer and state radio administrator
 Kim Malthe-Bruun (1923–1945), a mythical Danish resistance fighter against the Nazi occupation
 Laurids Valdemar Bruun (1864–1935), a Danish author
 Mads Pagh Bruun (1809–1884), a Danish politician
 Magnus Bruun (1984-), a Danish actor
 Morten Bruun (1965-), a Danish football player
 Patrick M. Bruun (1920–2007), a Finnish historian
 Per Gunnar Bruun (born 1944), a Swedish musician
 Peter Daniel Bruun (1796–1864), a Danish politician
 Peter Andreas Holck Bruun (1977-), a Danish social psychologist
 Poul Bruun, a Danish music producer
 Staffan Bruun (born 1955), a Finnish author
 Thomas Christopher Bruun (1750–1834), a Danish philologist and author
 Charles Kristian Bonnycastle Bruun (1979–), a Canadian-Finnish actor

Persons with Brun as their surname
 Alice Adelaïde Brun (1904–1990) - Danish civil servant, member of the Boards of Directors of the World Bank 1962-1964
 Ane Brun (1976 -) - Norwegian singer/songwriter
 Charles Brun (1866–1919) - Danish politician
 Constantin Brun (1746–1836) - German-Danish merchant and one of the richest Danes of his day
 Eske Brun (1904–1987) - Danish governor in Greenland during World War II
 Friederike Brun (1765–1835)  German-Danish author and art patron, wife of Constantin Brun
 Johan Nordahl Brun (1745–1816) - Norwegian poet and bishop
 Johanne Marie Emilie Brun (1874–1954) - Danish opera singer
 Viggo Brun (1885–1978) - Norwegian mathematician

See also 
 Bruhn

References

Danish-language surnames
Norwegian-language surnames
Swedish-language surnames